The 2016 Boston Breakers season, is the club's eleventh season overall, its seventh consecutive season, and fourth year as a member of the National Women's Soccer League.

Club

Coaching staff

First-team squad 
As of July 12, 2016

Competitions
Key

Preseason
As in previous seasons, Breakers spent time in Florida during preseason.

Regular season

Standings

Results summary

Results by round

Squad statistics
Source: NWSL

Key to positions: FW – Forward, MF – Midfielder, DF – Defender, GK – Goalkeeper

References

See also 
 2016 National Women's Soccer League season
 2016 in American soccer

2016 National Women's Soccer League season
American soccer clubs 2016 season
Boston Breakers seasons
2016 in sports in Massachusetts